The Flying Fox, also known as The Purple Lightning Sword, is a 1964 Hong Kong wuxia film produced by Gam Wing and directed by Siu Sang.

Cast
Yu So-chow as Tik Siu-ching
Cheung Ying-choi as Man Lei-wan
Connie Chan as Tung-fong Ming
Lee Pang-fei as Duke Pui-tik
Liu Chia-liang as Monkey of North Mountain
Sai Gwa-pau as Wu Juju
Shih Kien as Yum-yeung Kwai-sao
Sum Chi-wah as Sheung-koon Kei
Tong Ka as Wai Ling
Yuen Siu-tien as Dragon of East Sea

References

External links

1964 films
Hong Kong martial arts films
Wuxia films
1960s Cantonese-language films